Music Uplate Live (also known as M.U. Live) is a Philippine late night musical variety show airing before network sign-off on ABS-CBN. Premiering March 15, 2010, its main presenters include Yeng Constantino and Tutti Caringal. The program also airs every Monday afternoon on Studio 23 (now S+A) and worldwide through The Filipino Channel. The show's final episode was aired on September 2, 2011.

Hosts
Yeng Constantino (Monday-Thursday)
Tutti Caringal (Monday-Thursday)
Gazelle "Speedy Gee" Canlas (Monday-Friday)
Martin Concio (Monday-Friday)

Segments
Tambayan Hit Chart (Monday) 
Odyssey/Astrovision Hit Charts (Tuesday) 
Pinoy Myx Countdown Top 5 (Wednesday)
Musicology (Thursday)  
Break Mo 'To Artist (Friday) 
MMQ
My Playlist
Uplate Update

External links

ABS-CBN original programming
Philippine variety television shows
2010 Philippine television series debuts
2011 Philippine television series endings
Filipino-language television shows